Knockatee is a townland in County Westmeath, Ireland.

Knockatee spans the civil parishes of Taghmon and Tyfarnham. It is one of the 11 townlands in Taghmon and one of the 11 townlands in Tyfarnham, both in the barony of Corkaree in the Province of Leinster.

The neighbouring townlands are: Parsonstown and Sheefin to the north, Monkstown and Toberaquill to the east, Knockdrin to the south and Garraree to the west.

In the 1911 census of Ireland there were 12 houses and 62 inhabitants in the townland.

References

External links
Map of Knockatee at openstreetmap.org
Knockatee at the IreAtlas Townland Data Base
Knockatee at Townlands.ie
Knockatee at The Placenames Database of Ireland

Townlands of County Westmeath